The 2003 Bulgarian Cup Final was the final match of the 2002–03 edition of the Bulgarian Cup competition. It was the 21st consecutive Bulgarian Cup final match after the competition was established and 63rd national cup final overall.

The match was held on 21 May 2003 at the Vasil Levski National Stadium in Sofia, Bulgaria. Levski Sofia beat Litex Lovech 2–1. The win gave Levski their 24th Bulgarian Cup success.

Match

Details

See also
2002–03 A Group

References

Bulgarian Cup finals
PFC Levski Sofia matches
PFC Litex Lovech matches
Cup Final